Camp d'Esports is a multi-use stadium in Lleida, Catalonia.  It is currently used mostly for football matches and is the home ground of Lleida Esportiu.  The stadium holds 13,500 seats, and the dimensions for the football field are 102x68 meters. The architect responsible for the project was Adrian Florensa.

The construction of the stadium begun in 1918 and finished in 1919. On January 1, 1919 the sports complex named "Camp d'Esports" was officially opened. It underwent extensive renovations in 1993 and 1994.

League attendances
This is a list of league and playoffs games attendances of Lleida Esportiu at Camp d'Esports.

See also
Pavelló Barris Nord

References

External links

Stadium file at the city of Lleida's website 
Estadios de Espana 

UE Lleida
Football venues in Catalonia
Buildings and structures in Lleida
Lleida Esportiu
Sports venues completed in 1919